Pseudoperna is a genus of extinct very small oysters. Pseudoperna lived in tight groups. This small oyster is commonly found attached in groups to the shell of large species such as Inoceramus. Pycnodonte and Pseudoperna are preserved mostly as calcitic valves and are also found attached to Mytiloides.

References 

Ostreidae
Prehistoric bivalve genera
Cretaceous bivalves
Prehistoric bivalves of North America
Cretaceous animals of South America